The Arlington Heights Historic District is a national historic district located at Arlington County, Virginia. It contains 737 contributing buildings and 1 contributing site in a residential neighborhood in central Arlington. The area was formed from the integration of twenty-five subdivisions platted between 1909 and 1978.  Single-family dwellings include representative examples of the Tudor Revival and Colonial Revival styles.  The district is primarily a single-family residential neighborhood with a number of twin dwellings, is also home to garden apartments, one high-rise apartment building, a commercial building, a synagogue, a parsonage, a middle school with community center, and two landscaped parks.

It was listed on the National Register of Historic Places in 2008.

References

Neighborhoods in Arlington County, Virginia
Houses on the National Register of Historic Places in Virginia
Tudor Revival architecture in Virginia
Colonial Revival architecture in Virginia
Historic districts in Arlington County, Virginia
National Register of Historic Places in Arlington County, Virginia
Houses in Arlington County, Virginia
Historic districts on the National Register of Historic Places in Virginia